The monkeyface prickleback (Cebidichthys violaceus), also commonly known as the monkeyface eel, is a species of prickleback native to the Pacific coast of North America. Despite being commonly called an eel due to its body shape, it does not fall into the fish order Anguilliformes with true eels, but the Perciformes along with nearly half of all bony fish.

Ecology
Ranging from southern Oregon down to the northern reaches of the Mexican state of Baja California, monkeyface pricklebacks are coastal fish that live in rocky, tidal areas close to shore. First described by Girard in 1854, the fish spawn on the sea floor and show some nest guarding behavior. While young monkeyface pricklebacks feed on zooplankton and crustaceans, adults are primarily herbivorous, feeding on red and green algae. Adults have few predators other than humans, but young fish are vulnerable to birds and other fish, such as grass rockfish.

Fishery

Monkeyface pricklebacks have long been sought after for their edible white flesh, with remains found in the middens of Native American peoples along the California coast.
In the modern era, the fish's appeal is and has always been mostly among amateur anglers. The most common method of acquiring it is "poke poling": a technique involving a long bamboo rod and a baited hook stuck into the crevices where monkeyface prickleback are known to hide.

In 2012, a fad for monkeyface eel in restaurants of the San Francisco Bay Area spawned a tiny commercial fishery, mostly spurred by local foragers interested in catch that is unusual and less heavily fished.

References

External links

 Monkeyface-eel at the Monterey Bay Aquarium

Xiphisterinae
Fish described in 1854